Loab is a fictional character that Twitter user Supercomposite has claimed to have discovered with an unspecified text-to-image AI model in April 2022. The user described it as an unexpectedly emergent property of the software, saying they discovered it when asking the model to produce something "as different from the prompt as possible".

History
Swedish-based musician and artist Supercomposite has said they first generated these images in April 2022 by using the algorithmic technique of "negative prompt weights" accessing latent space, the initial prompt – 'Brando::-1', requesting the opposite of actor Marlon Brando – generated a "skyline logo" with cryptic lettering. Attempting to generate the opposite of this image using the prompt "DIGITA PNTICS skyline logo::-1" yielded what Supercomposite described as "off-putting images, all of the same devastated-looking older woman with defined triangles of rosacea(?) on her cheeks". Supercomposite nicknamed the character "Loab", after one of the generated images resembled an album cover that included the printed word "loab".

Supercomposite says that using the image as a prompt for further images produced increasingly violent and gory results. Supercomposite speculated that something about the image could be "adjacent to extremely gory and macabre imagery in the distribution of the AI's world knowledge". Supercomposite says that when they combined images of Loab with other pictures, the subsequent results consistently return an image including Loab, regardless of how much distortion they added to the prompts to try and remove her visage. Supercomposite speculated that the latent space region of the AI map that Loab is located in, in addition to being near gruesome imagery, must be isolated enough that any combinations with other images could only use Loab from her area and no related images due to its isolation. After enough crossbreeding of images and dilution attempts, Supercomposite was able to eventually generate images without Loab, but found that crossbreeding those diluted images would also eventually lead to a version of Loab to reappear in the resulting images.

Supercomposite has said that "for various reasons" they are declining to disclose the software used to create the images. Loab has been referred to as the "first AI-generated cryptid" and as such has gone viral. Despite hyping up the cryptid nature of the discovery in their wording, Supercomposite admitted that "Loab isn't really haunted, of course", but noted that the mythos that has sprung up around the AI-generated character has gone beyond their initial involvement. Also, since more images of Loab are being made by other artists now, future AIs will use those images as a part of their latent space maps, making her an innate part of the internet landscape now, with Supercomposite adding "If we want to get rid of her, it’s already too late."

Response
There has been discussion of whether the Loab series of images are "a legitimate quirk of AI art software, or a cleverly disguised creepypasta."  Smithsonian magazine has written that "Loab sparked some lengthy ethical conversations around visual aesthetics, art and technology," and some have criticized the labeling of a woman with rosacea as a horror image, considering this to be "stigmatizing disability". Supercomposite responded that if the AI map is combining Loab with violent imagery, then that is a "social bias" in the data being used for the image modeling software. The Atlantic writer Stephen Marche described Loab as a "form of expression that has never existed before" whose authorship is unclear and that exists as an "emanation of the collective imagistic heritage, the unconscious visual mind". Laurens Verhagen in de Volkskrant commented that rather than showing that there are "dark horror creatures hidden deep within AI", the existence of Loab instead implies that our current "understanding of AI is limited". Mhairi Aitken at the Alan Turing Institute stated that rather than a "creepy" emergent property, output results like Loab are representative of the "limitations of AI image-generator models" and was more concerned about the urban legends that are born from such "boring" innocuous things and how easily "other people take these things seriously". Carly Cassella for ScienceAlert described Loab as a "modern day tronie" that isn't representative of something that is an actual person, but just a concept or idea, similar but distinct from tronies like the Girl With A Pearl Earring.

See also
 Artificial intelligence art
 Contrastive Language-Image Pre-training (CLIP), an image recognition artificial intelligence system
 Flashed face distortion effect, another serendipitous visual phenomenon
 Crungus, another AI-generated cryptid

References

External links 
 An interview with Loab's creator

Text-to-image generation
Digital art
Face perception
Urban legends
Fictional characters introduced in 2022
Artificial intelligence art